"Sendin' All My Love" is a song by the American sibling group The Jets. It was written by Stephen Bray (who is perhaps best known for his frequent collaborations with Madonna during the 1980s) and Linda Mallah.

Released as a single from The Jets' multi-platinum album Magic, the song was not nearly as successful as some other recordings by the group on the Billboard Hot 100 chart, where it stalled at number 88 and only reached number 72 on the R&B chart.  However, in October, 1988, "Sendin' All My Love" was The Jets' first (and, to date, only) number 1 song on the dance chart, where it stayed for one week.

Remixes
The 12" single featured the following remixes:
"Justin Strauss Summer Splash Mix" – 7:20
"Deep Dive Dubapella" – 7:12
"Drumapella" – 4:37

Chart performance

See also
List of number-one dance hits (United States)

References

External links
12" single release info at Discogs.com

1988 singles
The Jets (band) songs
Songs written by Stephen Bray
1987 songs
MCA Records singles